An Emergency Detection System (EDS) is a system that is used on crewed rocket missions. It monitors critical launch vehicle and spacecraft systems and issues status, warning and abort commands to the crew during their mission to low Earth orbit. It can trigger the Launch Abort System which will take the astronauts to safety.

See also
Saturn V Instrument Unit - Emergency detection
Human-rating certification

References
NASA Technical Note TN-D6487 (pdf), pp. 3, 6, vii

Spacecraft components